Kang Byul (Korean: 강별, born August 9, 1990) is a South Korean actress. She made her acting debut in 2008 and was cast in her first leading role in the television drama Miss Mamma Mia (2015).

Personal life
Her maternal uncle is actor Kang Sung-jin.

Filmography

Television series

Film

Variety show

Music video

References

External links
Kang Byul at Huayi Brothers 

1990 births
Living people
South Korean television actresses
South Korean film actresses
Seoul American High School alumni
Hanyang University alumni
Actresses from Seoul
21st-century South Korean actresses